Streptomyces zhihengii is a bacterium species from the genus of Streptomyces which has been isolated from rhizospheric soil from the plant Psammosilene tunicoides from Lijiang in China.

See also 
 List of Streptomyces species

References

External links
Type strain of Streptomyces zhihengii at BacDive -  the Bacterial Diversity Metadatabase

 

zhihengii
Bacteria described in 2017